Francis Fane (5 December 1752 – 10 November 1813) of Spettisbury, near Blandford, Dorset, was a British Member of Parliament.

Life
Francis Fane was born on 5 December 1752, the third son of Henry Fane of Wormsley and his third wife Charlotte, daughter of Richard Luther of Miles, near Ongar in Essex. He was educated at Corpus Christi College, Cambridge, graduating in 1768.

He was Member of Parliament for the constituency of Lyme Regis from 11 June 1777 until 1780 and for Dorchester in the Parliaments of 1790, 1796, 1802, 1806.

Family
Fane married Anne Cooke, who succeeded to her father's estates in Somerset and Dorset in 1777. They had no children.

Notes

References

1752 births
1813 deaths
Alumni of Corpus Christi College, Cambridge
British MPs 1774–1780
British MPs 1790–1796
British MPs 1796–1800
Francis
Members of the Parliament of Great Britain for English constituencies
Members of the Parliament of the United Kingdom for English constituencies
Tory MPs (pre-1834)
UK MPs 1801–1802
UK MPs 1802–1806
UK MPs 1806–1807